Viatel is a Dublin-based telecoms operator.

Viatel was founded in 1991 by Martin Varsavsky. In 1994, it went public on the Nasdaq stock exchange. Four years later, Varsavsky sold his stake in Viatel for US$200 million and left the company.

In 1999, Viatel's market capitalization was valued at US$1.2 billion. At that time, Viatel's second-largest outside shareholder was George Soros while the largest outside stake was held by the global telecommunications company COMSAT.

The European arm of Viatel was purchased in May 2013, by the Irish telecoms operator Digiweb.

In November 2015 it was announced that Zayo was in the process of buying Viatel's UK and mainland Europe network, but leaving the Irish network to continue under the name of Viatel. The €98.8m transaction was completed on December 31, 2015.

Since 2018, Viatel have driven  new strategy as an Ireland & Europe focused business telecoms, cloud and cyber security provider, with significant Irish and global brands as customers. Following considerable organic growth and a series of acquisitions, Viatel now employs over 275 people with locations in Dublin, Dundalk and Limerick.

Awards 
In May 2014 Viatel was nominated for Wholesale Service Provider of the Year, and Network Operator of the Year  at the Comms Business Awards.

For a second year in a row, they were shortlisted for Wholesale Service Provider of the Year at the Comms Business Awards, came Highly Commended for Best Wholesale Service Provider at the Comms National Awards, and were nominated for Capacity Magazine's Global Carrier Awards for Best Pan-European Wholesale Carrier.

Viatel is a Deloitte Best Managed Company and was honoured to be named as Cisco Transformation & Innovation Partner Award Winner 2021.

In January 2022, Viatel announced the acquisition of the Limerick-based digital transformation services provider, ActionPoint.

References

External links
 

Telecommunications companies of the United Kingdom
Companies that filed for Chapter 11 bankruptcy in 2001